Our Lady of Sorrows Church or Church of Our Lady of Sorrows or Our Lady of Sorrows Catholic Church may refer to:

Canada
 Our Lady of Sorrows Roman Catholic Church, Kingsway, Etobicoke, Ontario

Chile
 Church of Our Lady of Sorrows, Dalcahue, Chiloé Island

Latvia
 Our Lady of Sorrows Church, Riga

Malaysia
 Church of Our Lady of Sorrows in City Parish, George Town, Penang

Malta
Our Lady of Sorrows Chapel, Mqabba

Pakistan
 Our Lady of Sorrows Church, Kasur

Portugal
 Church of Our Lady of Sorrows, Póvoa de Varzim

Slovakia
 Our Lady of Sorrows Church, Poprad

Sri Lanka
 Our Lady of Sorrows Church, Kandawala, Negombo

United Kingdom

England
 Our Lady of Sorrows Church, Bognor Regis, West Sussex
Our Lady of Sorrows Church, Bamford, Derbyshire

Wales
 Our Lady of Sorrows Church, Dolgellau

Gibraltar
 Our Lady of Sorrows Church, Gibraltar

United States

 Our Lady of Sorrows Church (Santa Barbara, California)
 Our Lady of Sorrows Catholic Church in Wahiawa, Hawaii
 Our Lady of Sorrows Roman Catholic Church (South Orange, New Jersey)
 Our Lady of Sorrows Church (Bernalillo, New Mexico), listed on the National Register of Historic Places
 Our Lady of Sorrows Church (Las Vegas, New Mexico), listed on the National Register of Historic Places
 Church of Our Lady of Sorrows (New York City)
Our Lady of Sorrows Catholic Church (Rock Springs, Wyoming), listed on the National Register of Historic Places

See also 
 Our Lady of Sorrows
 Our Lady of Sorrows Basilica, Chicago
 Our Lady of Sorrows Chapel,  La Crosse, Wisconsin